Niccolò Fabi (born 16 May 1968) is an Italian singer-songwriter. He rose to national fame after competing in the Newcomers' section of the Sanremo Music Festival in 1997, receiving the Mia Martini Critics' Award for his entry "Capelli".

As of 2021, he has released nine studio albums and a greatest hits album in Italy, as well as two compilation albums for the Hispanic market. During his career, Fabi also received two Lunezia Awards for the album "La cura del tempo" and for the song "Costruire".

Early life
Niccolò Fabi was born in Rome on 16 May 1968. His father, Claudio Fabi, was a record producer mainly active in the 1970s, when he was the artistic director of Lucio Battisti's label Numero Uno, producing artists including the Premiata Forneria Marconi and Alberto Fortis.
When he was 5 years old, he started studying piano and classical music. In 1981, he started playing drums. He later entered a band performing songs by artists such as Earth, Wind & Fire, and he also became the drummer of the Fall Out, a Police cover band.

He started writing songs at the age of 14. In 1986, Fabi also worked as a stage assistant during a tour by Alberto Fortis, tuning his guitars.
In 1994, Fabi graduated in Philology.

Music career

1996–1997: Breakthrough
Fabi released his first single, "Dica", in 1996. Thanks to the success of the song, the following year he took part in the Sanremo Music Festival, competing in the Newcomers' section with the song "Capelli". The song received the Mia Martini Critics' Award in its category. Shortly after the competition, Fabi released his debut album, Il giardiniere, which sold more than 100,000 copies in Italy.

Thanks to the success of his first album, in April 1998 Fabi received a nomination for Revelation of the Year at the Premio Italiano della Musica, sponsored by the Italian radio network Radio DeeJay and the music magazine Musica!.

1998: Second studio album
In 1998, Fabi competed once again in the Sanremo Music Festival, performing the song "Lasciarsi un giorno a Roma" in the "Big Artists" section. The song was chosen as the lead single from Fabi's second studio set, released by Virgin Records on 10 April 1998. The album also includes "Vento d'estate", a duet with Max Gazzè, which was performed won the music competition Un disco per l'estate.
As of February 1999, the album had sold 80,000 copies in Italy.

2000–2001: Sereno ad ovest and Spanish-language debut
In 2000, Fabi released his third studio album, preceded by the single "Se fossi Marco". The single was also performed during the itinerant music competition Festivalbar, held throughout Italy during the summer of 2000 on broadcast by Italia 1.

In 2001, Fabi also released his first album for the Hispanic maret. The self-titled set is a compilation album composed of tracks from Il giardiniere and Niccolò Fabi, including five Spanish language adaptation of his best-known hits.

2008–2009: Violenza 124 and Solo un uomo
In 2008, Fabi produced the project Violenza 124, featuring Italian artists with different musical styles and backgrounds. The involved artists, beside Fabi himself, are Subsonica's keyboardist Boosta, pop-rock singer-songwriter Roberto Angelini, strings group Gnu Quartet, post-rock band Mokadelic and the duo composed of Olivia Salvadori and Franco Mussida, two artists mixing opera with electronic music. Each one of them was asked to independently develop the same basic idea on the theme of violence, and Fabi later mixed the produced results in a 36-minutes-long song which was released both as a freely available track on the Web and as a double CD, also including the original contributions of the involved artists as separate tracks.

In 2009, he was among the 56 artists composing the supergroup Artisti Uniti per l'Abruzzo. The band recorded the song "Domani 21/04.09", a cover of Mauro Pagani's "Domani" released as a charity single to raise funds in support of the victims of the 2009 L'Aquila earthquake.

After splitting with Virgin Records, which released all his previous albums, Fabi signed a new contract with Universal Music, which released Fabi's sixth studio album, Solo un uomo, in May 2010. The single with the same title was released to Italian radio stations on 17 April 2009. Fabi later revealed he submitted the song for the Sanremo Music Festival 2009, it was rejected by the jury during the internal selection.

Parole di Lulù and Ecco
In July 2010, Fabi's daughter, Olivia, died from a meningococcal meningitis. After canceling his scheduled tour, Fabi decided to organize a mega-concert in her memory, involving several Italian singers and friends, including Elisa, Jovanotti, Fiorella Mannoia, Giuliano Sangiorgi, Max Gazzè, Daniele Silvestri, Samuele Bersani and Subsonica. All the proceedings from the concert were donated to build a children's hospital in Angola. The concert was also released as a DVD, which also contributed raising funds for the same purpose. The DVD, titled Parole per Lulù, also included the track "Parole parole", recorded in studio with Mina and released as a single.

In 2011, Fabi penned the song "Lontano da tutto", performed by Serena Abrami during the 61st Sanremo Music Festival, and the track "Nel primo sguardo", performed by Laura Pausini as a duet with her sister Silvia and included in the album Inedito.

Niccolò Fabi's seventh studio album, Ecco, was released on 9 October 2012. The album, featuring guest appearances by artists including trumpeter Roy Paci and singer-songwriter Roberto Angelini, was preceded by the single "Una buona idea". Ecco debuted at number 3 on the Italian Albums Chart, becoming his first top ten album.

Fabi-Silvestri-Gazzè and Una somma di piccole cose
In 2014 Fabi started together with Daniele Silvestri and Max Gazzè the musical project Fabi-Silvestri-Gazzè. The trio released a studio album (Il padrone della festa), a live album (l padrone della festa – Live) and made an extensive tour in Italy and Europe.

In April 2016 Fabi released his eighth studio album, Una somma di piccole cose. The album peaked at the first place on the Italian hit parade.

Personal life
Fabi lives with his partner Shirin Amini, an Italian painter of Iranian origins. In 2008, Shirin gave birth to the couple's first daughter, Olivia. Nicknamed Lulubella, she died on 4 July 2010 from a meningococcal meningitis. After canceling the scheduled summer tour, Fabi confirmed his daughter's death through his Facebook account.

The couple's second child, Kim, was born on 17 September 2012.

Discography

Albums

Studio albums

Compilation albums

Awards and nominations

Notes

External links

 Niccolò Fabi at Allmusic

1968 births
Italian male singers
Italian pop singers
Living people
Musicians from Rome
Italian singer-songwriters